Henrique Loureiro dos Santos (born May 13, 1986), known as Henrique, is a soccer defender from Brazil.

Career
Henrique began his career with Catuense-BA and joined in July 2006 to Inter (SM). After a half year left in summer 2007 Inter (SM) and signed with Bahia, later signed in October 2007 with Colo-Colo-BRA. He left Colo-Colo-BRA in January 2008 and signed with Tupi, after just few months signed with Ituano. On 16 May 2009 Palmeiras have signed the right-back from Ituano.

References

External links
 
 Henrique at Wepes Upgrade
 
 

1986 births
Brazilian footballers
Living people
Sportspeople from Bahia
Campeonato Brasileiro Série A players
Colo Colo de Futebol e Regatas players
Tupi Football Club players
Ituano FC players
Sociedade Esportiva Palmeiras players
Vila Nova Futebol Clube players
São Bernardo Futebol Clube players
Fortaleza Esporte Clube players
Boa Esporte Clube players
Volta Redonda FC players
Macaé Esporte Futebol Clube players
Association football fullbacks